The southern pig-footed bandicoot (Chaeropus ecaudatus) was a small species of herbivorous marsupial in the genus Chaeropus, the pig-footed bandicoots.

Taxonomy 
The description of the population was revised in 2019,  separating a central western population as Chaeropus yirratji and recognised two earlier descriptions as subspecies Chaeropus ecaudatus ecaudatus (found in southeastern Australia) and Chaeropus ecaudatus occidentalis (found in western and southwestern Australia).

Description 
It has been believed to be extinct since the mid-20th century, having reportedly vanished from its final refuge in southern Australia by 1945. It was presumably the first of the two species of Chaeropus to go extinct. Pig footed-bandicoots were the only marsupials to walk on reduced digits both on the fore and hind feet. In addition, the pig footed-bandicoot diverges from two different species. According to molecular phylogenetic analyses they diverged from other bandicoots like the Peramelidae, and also from the bilbies like Thylacomyidae in the mid-Late Oligocene.

It is thought to have been distributed in shrubland habitats in the southern regions of Australia's deserts, and its range likely extended to Western Australia. It physically closely resembled the northern pig-footed bandicoot (C. yirratji), but it had fewer holes on its palate and shorter feet. It also had a different dentition than C. yirratji, indicating that it may have had a different diet. C. ecaudatus rapidly adapted to drying conditions and changing environment, quickly becoming a grazer in a short period of time C. ecaudatus is thought to have undergone rapid herbivorous evolution due to lesser high crown and lateral blade development on the lower molars found in an ancestral species, Chaeropus baynesi. The two species were formerly considered conspecific until a study released in 2019 found them to be separate species. This species likely went extinct due to predation by introduced red foxes and feral cats, as well as habitat degradation by introduced livestock.

References 

Mammals described in 1838
Extinct mammals of Australia
Peramelemorphs
Extinct marsupials
Mammal extinctions since 1500
Extinct mammals of South Australia
Mammals of Western Australia
Mammals of New South Wales
Mammals of Victoria (Australia)
Marsupials of Australia